The Lathrop House, also known as the Bryan Lathrop House, is a Georgian style house at 120 E Bellevue Place in the Gold Coast neighborhood of Chicago, Illinois, United States.  The house was built in 1892 by McKim, Mead & White for Bryan Lathrop. In 1922 the house was sold to the Fortnightly Club. The club still occupies the building. It was designated a Chicago Landmark on May 9, 1973, and it was listed on the National Register of Historic Places in 1974.

References

Houses completed in 1892
Houses on the National Register of Historic Places in Chicago
Chicago Landmarks